The Realm of the Rye is a 1929 Swedish black-and-white silent film directed by Ivar Johansson and starring Mathias Taube, Margit Manstad and Eric Laurent. The film's sets were designed by the art director Vilhelm Bryde. It was remade into a 1950 film  The Realm of the Rye, also directed by Johansson

Cast
Mathias Taube as Mattias Spangar
 Eric Laurent as 	Markus
 Märtha Lindlöf as 	Widow
 Margit Manstad as Klara
 Artur Cederborgh as 	Prophet
 Gustav Runsten as 	Farmhand
 Axel Slangus as Kniv-Pekka
 Gösta Ericsson as 	Ante
 Solveig Hedengran as Stina
 Lizzie Nyström as 	Old Maid
 Sven Bergvall as 	Gusten
 Wictor Hagman as Jan
 Hilda Borgström as 	Bonfgumma
 Helga Brofeldt as 	Maid
 Hilda Castegren as Old Countrywoman
 Julia Cæsar as 	Maid
 Tyra Dörum as 	Old Countrywoman
 Signe Enwall as 	Maid
 Knut Frankman as 	Neighbour
 Gustaf Gjerdrum as 	Priest
 Gunhild Robertson as 	Old Countrywoman
 Edla Rothgardt as 	Old Countrywoman

References

Bibliography 
 Qvist, Per Olov & von Bagh, Peter. Guide to the Cinema of Sweden and Finland. Greenwood Publishing Group, 2000.

External links

1929 films
Swedish black-and-white films
1929 drama films
Swedish silent feature films
Swedish drama films
Films directed by Ivar Johansson
1929 directorial debut films
Silent drama films
1920s Swedish films